Alphabravocharliedeltaechofoxtrotgolf is the first album by Australian new wave group Models. The title alludes to the first seven letters of the NATO phonetic alphabet. The LP album cover claimed it was produced by no-one, in fact, it was recorded independently by engineer Tony Cohen and the group, prior to signing with Mushroom Records. It was released in November 1980, but no singles were released commercially from the album, although "Two People Per km²" and "Uncontrollable Boy" were on a 12-inch disc released to radio stations, and a music video was made for "Two People Per km²".

The album was re-released on CD in 1990.

Background
Models had formed in Melbourne in 1978 by former members of Teenage Radio Stars and JAB. Following some line-up changes they consolidated into Andrew Duffield on keyboards, Mark Ferrie on bass guitar, Janis Friedenfelds (aka Johnny Crash) on drums and percussion, and Sean Kelly on vocals and lead guitar. Their first release in October 1979 was a give-away single, "Early Morning Brain (It's Not Quite the Same as Sobriety)" backed with The Boys Next Door's "Scatterbrain". Friction within the band led to their break-up in November, record producers Vanda & Young asked Models to cut some demos - so they reformed at the end of December.

Their second single was another giveaway, "Owe You Nothing," composed of tracks from the Vanda and Young sessions. It appeared in August 1980. In November of that year the Duffield, Ferrie, Friedenfelds and Kelly line-up released Models' first album, Alphabravocharliedeltaechofoxtrotgolf, on Mushroom Records. It peaked at #43 on the Australian albums chart. The album was well received by audiences familiar with the group from the live pub circuit. No singles were released commercially from the album, although "Two People Per km²" and "Uncontrollable Boy" were on a 12-inch disc released to radio stations, and a music video was made for "Two People Per km²". The video was directed by Ray Argall as part of a short film about the group.

The band performed extensively both locally and interstate, supporting the Ramones and Midnight Oil on a national tour.

Early in 1981, Friedenfelds was replaced by Buster Stiggs from New Zealand band The Swingers. In June, Models released a 10" album, Cut Lunch, which consisted of further tracks originally intended as demos, produced by Tony Cohen and Models except one produced by Split Enz keyboard player Eddie Rayner.

Track listing

Personnel

Musicians
Sean Kelly – guitar, clarinet, vocals
Andrew Duffield – keyboards, EMS Synthi AKS
Mark Ferrie – bass guitar; vocals on "Pull the Pin"
Janis Freidenfelds (aka Johnny Crash) – percussion, traps, syncussion

Technical Personnel
Producer – no-one; recorded independently by Models with Tony Cohen
Engineer – Tony Cohen

References

1980 debut albums
Models (band) albums
Mushroom Records albums